Marske (1750 – July 1779)  was a Thoroughbred racehorse, best known as siring the great Eclipse.

Racing career
Bred by John Hutton at Marske Hall (Marske, Richmondshire), Yorkshire, he was traded to the Prince William, Duke of Cumberland (also the breeder and owner of Herod) as a foal for a chestnut Arabian.

In 1754, he won the Jockey Club Plate on Newmarket's Round Course against Pytho and Brilliant, and a 300 guineas match against Ginger. The following year, he came third in a race at Newmarket, and did not run again until 1756, when he lost twice again, this time in two 1,000 guineas matches against Snap (by Snip). He was then retired to stud.

Summary

Breeding career
Marske stood at the Duke's Cumberland stud until his owner died in 1765. Being a rather average horse up to that point, he was then sold at Tattersall's to a Dorset farmer for a 'trifling sum'.  At the farm, he covered mares for half a guinea.  The farmer then sold him for only 20 guineas to William Wildman.  He covered mares at Bisterne, Hampshire for 3gs and 5s in 1767, 5gs and 5s in 1769 and 10gs and 5s in 1770, before his fee was raised to 30gs and 5s.  However, it wasn't until his greatest son, Eclipse showed talent on the track that Marske became extremely popular. He was then sold for a large profit of 1,000 guineas to Willoughby Bertie, 4th Earl of Abingdon, who raised his stud fee to 100 guineas. During his 22 years at the Earl's stud in Rycote, Oxfordshire, Marske sired across the next generation 154 winners. Top offspring include:

 Eclipse: 1764 chestnut colt, undefeated on the turf, winning all 18 of his races. He was even more influential as a sire, and today it is estimated that up to 95% of Thoroughbreds are descended from this horse.
 Young Marske: 1771 bay colt, broke down in his first race, but at stud he produced many good broodmares as well as Ruler (1777 colt, winner of the St. Leger), Fortitude (1778), Patriot (1787), Shuttle (1793), Abba Thulle (1786), Spanker (1787), Columbine (1783), and Prince Lee Boo (1784).
 Hephestion: 1771 colt, won the Jockey Club Plate & Craven Stakes
 Narcissus: 1771 colt
 Leviathan ("Mungo"): 1771 colt, good sire
 Shark: 1771 brown colt, top racehorse winning more than any other horse of his time, with a record of 19 wins in 29 starts, earnings of 16,057 guineas. Wins included a 1774 match for 500 guineas, a 1775 subscription sweep, the Clermont Cup, a 1,000 guineas match against Johnny. At stud he produced very little, and was exported to Virginia where he left several good broodmares. His top offspring of note in England was Violet (1787) dam to Goldenlocks (by Delpini) and Thomasina (by Timothy).
 Pontac: sired Derby winner Sir Thomas
 Masquerade 1771 filly, a very good race mare 
 Desdemona 1770 filly, dam to Apothecary; third dam to Neva (1814, won Oaks and 1,000 Guineas), Magnolia (1771), and Proserpine (1766)

From these 22 years were sired 154 winners, of some £71,205 10s excluding non-monetary prizes and races won by unknown offspring, comparable to the wealth of an average feudal successor peer.  The peak years of his produce were 1775, when wins occurred in 24 races (for winners he had sired) who earned £18,500 15s in prize money, and the next year saw 23 such wins and £19,235 13s to the various foals' owners.

He died in July 1779 and was commemorated with the following poem:

References

Bibliography

External links
Thoroughbred Bloodlines: Marske
Thoroughbred Heritage – Eclipse

1750 racehorse births
1779 racehorse deaths
Racehorses bred in the Kingdom of Great Britain
Racehorses trained in the Kingdom of Great Britain
Thoroughbred family 8